Michael Stuart Moore (born May 5, 1974, in Cookeville, Tennessee) is an American comic book writer.

Biography

Career
Moore was born in Cookeville, Tennessee with both African-American and Brazilian ancestry. He took an early interest in writing and has read comics since he was seven years old. He began to write and submit stories to Eclipse Comics while still in high school, which were never published. Moore found success in 1997 after being signed on as a writer for Azteca Productions, and wrote and co-plotted the first issue of the Team Tejas series. He later became the writer for the new El Gato Negro series, El Gato Negro: Nocturnal Warrior, in a three-part story-arc entitled, "Legacy".

See also

 P.A.C.A.S.

References

External links
 Official ComicSpace

1974 births
Living people
People from Cookeville, Tennessee
American comics writers